HR 6135 is single star in the southern constellation of Apus, less than a degree from the northern constellation border with Triangulum Australe. Its declination of  puts it just within 20 degrees of the southern celestial pole. The star has an orange hue and is faintly visible to the naked eye with an apparent visual magnitude of 5.50, making it the 12th-brightest star in the constellation. It is located at a distance of approximately 1,000 light years from the Sun based on parallax, but is drifting closer with a radial velocity of −9.5 km/s. It has an absolute magnitude of −1.45.

This is an aging bright giant with a stellar classification of K0.5IIbCN1, where the suffix notation indicates an anomalous overabundance of cyanogen in the spectrum. It is a mild barium star, which may indicate it is on the asymptotic giant branch stage of its evolution. The star has expanded to 49 times the radius of the Sun and is radiating 843 times the Sun's luminosity from its swollen photosphere at an effective temperature of 4,592 K.

References

K-type bright giants
Barium stars
Apus (constellation)
Durchmusterung objects
148488
081141
6135